Gabriel Neves Perdomo (born 11 August 1997) is a Uruguayan professional footballer who plays as a defensive midfielder for Brazilian club São Paulo and the Uruguay national team.

Club career

Nacional
A youth academy graduate of Nacional, Neves made his professional debut on 3 February 2018 in a 4–2 win against Montevideo City Torque.

São Paulo
On 30 August 2021, Neves joined Campeonato Brasileiro Série A club São Paulo until December 2022.

International career
On 9 November 2020, Neves received maiden call-up to Uruguay national team as a replacement for injured Federico Valverde. He made his debut four days later in a 3–0 win against Colombia.

Career statistics

Club

International

Honours
Nacional
 Uruguayan Primera División: 2019, 2020
 Supercopa Uruguaya: 2019

References

External links

1997 births
Living people
Association football midfielders
Uruguayan footballers
Uruguayan Primera División players
Campeonato Brasileiro Série A players
Club Nacional de Football players
São Paulo FC players
Uruguay youth international footballers
Uruguay international footballers